Seoul National University Gymnasium is an indoor sporting arena located in Seoul, South Korea.  The capacity of the arena is 5,000 and was built in 1986 to host table tennis and badminton (demonstration) events at the 1988 Summer Olympics.

References
1988 Summer Olympic official report. Volume 1. Part 1. p. 192.

Indoor arenas in South Korea
Venues of the 1988 Summer Olympics
Olympic badminton venues
Olympic table tennis venues
Sports venues in Seoul
Sports venues completed in 1986
Gymnasiums
1986 establishments in South Korea
Venues of the 1986 Asian Games
Asian Games table tennis venues